Major-General Peter Irvine Chiswell  (born 19 April 1930) is a former British Army officer.

Military career
Educated at Allhallows School and the Royal Military Academy Sandhurst, Chiswell was commissioned into the Devonshire Regiment in 1951. He became commanding officer of 3rd Battalion Parachute Regiment in 1969. He went on to be Deputy Chief of Staff for the United Nations Peacekeeping Force in Cyprus in 1974, commander of 44th Parachute Brigade in 1976 and Assistant Chief of Staff (Operations) for Northern Army Group in 1978. After that he became commander of Land Forces in Northern Ireland in 1982 and General Officer Commanding Wales in 1983 before retiring in 1985.

In 1958 he married Felicity Philippa Martin; they have two sons.

References

 

1930 births
Living people
British Army major generals
Companions of the Order of the Bath
Commanders of the Order of the British Empire
Devonshire Regiment officers
British Parachute Regiment officers